Stephen Alonzo Cobb (June 17, 1833 – August 24, 1878) was a U.S. Representative from Kansas.

Born in Madison, Maine, Cobb attended the common schools.
He moved with his father to Minnesota in 1850, where Stephen found work in the lumber business. He studied languages and prepared for college. He entered Beloit College, Beloit, Wisconsin, in 1854, where he was a student for two years. He was graduated from Brown University, Providence, Rhode Island, in 1858. He settled in Wyandotte, Kansas, in 1859 and commenced the practice of law. He entered the Union Army in 1862. He became captain and commissary sergeant of Volunteers on May 18, 1864. Brevetted major August 16, 1865, and honorably discharged on September 23, 1865. He served as mayor of Wyandotte in 1862 and again in 1868. He served in the State senate in 1862, 1869, and 1870. He served as member of the State house of representatives in 1872 and served as speaker.

Cobb was elected as a Republican to the Forty-third Congress (March 4, 1873 – March 3, 1875).
He was an unsuccessful candidate for reelection in 1874 to the Forty-fourth Congress.
He died in Wyandotte (now a part of Kansas City), Kansas, August 24, 1878. He was interred in Oak Grove Cemetery, Kansas City, Kansas.

Notes

References

1833 births
1878 deaths
Speakers of the Kansas House of Representatives
Republican Party Kansas state senators
Union Army officers
Republican Party members of the United States House of Representatives from Kansas
19th-century American politicians
People from Madison, Maine
Brown University alumni